The 1922–23 season is the 49th season of competitive football by Rangers.

Overview
Rangers played a total of 40 competitive matches during the 1922–23 season. The team finished top of the league, five points ahead of second placed Airdrieonians, after winning twenty-three of the 38 league games and recording an unbeaten home record.

The side was knocked out of the Scottish Cup in the second round that season. After overcoming Clyde, a shock 2-0 defeat to Ayr United ended the campaign.

Results
All results are written with Rangers' score first.

Scottish League Division One

Scottish Cup

Appearances

See also
1922–23 in Scottish football
1922–23 Scottish Cup

Rangers F.C. seasons
Rangers
Scottish football championship-winning seasons